Copelatus trilobatus is a species of diving beetle. It is part of the genus Copelatus of the subfamily Copelatinae in the family Dytiscidae. It was described by Régimbart in 1895.

References

trilobatus
Beetles described in 1895